is a former Japanese football player who last played for Gainare Tottori.

Career
After a long career, Oya retired in February 2020 to become a school coach for Vissel Kobe.

Club statistics
Updated to 23 February 2020.

References

External links

 

1986 births
Living people
Kansai University alumni
Association football people from Shimane Prefecture
Japanese footballers
J1 League players
J2 League players
Vissel Kobe players
Fagiano Okayama players
Omiya Ardija players
Tokushima Vortis players
Association football defenders